This list of tallest buildings in Ontario ranks skyscrapers and high rise buildings in the province of Ontario by height. Buildings in nine cities are included in this list; Hamilton, Kitchener, London, Markham, Mississauga, Niagara Falls, Ottawa, Toronto, and Windsor, each having  buildings taller than 100 metres.

The tallest building in the province of Ontario is First Canadian Place 298 metres (978 feet). Completed in 1976, it is also the tallest building in Canada and the 68th tallest building in the world. At the time of its completion, it was the tallest building in the world outside of Chicago and New York City.

Due to height restrictions, tall skyscrapers are restricted in many parts of Ottawa, including the downtown core. Initially the height restrictions were put in place as to prevent any building from exceeding the height of the Peace Tower of Parliament Hill.

In recent years, a development boom has caused many cities, that historically haven’t had tall buildings or dense urban cores, to densify and construct taller buildings  like Kitchener, Windsor, Markham, etc.

Buildings over 100 meters

This list ranks buildings in Ontario that stand between least 100 m (328 ft) tall, based on CTBUH height measurement standards. This includes spires and architectural details but does not include antenna masts. An equal sign (=) following a rank indicates the same height between two or more buildings. Freestanding observation and/or telecommunication towers, while not habitable buildings, are included for comparison purposes; however, they are not ranked. One such tower is the CN Tower.

See also
List of tallest buildings in Canada
List of tallest buildings in Quebec

By city
List of tallest buildings in Hamilton, Ontario
List of tallest buildings in London, Ontario
List of tallest buildings in Ottawa–Gatineau
List of tallest buildings in Mississauga
List of tallest buildings in Niagara Falls, Ontario
List of tallest buildings in Toronto
List of tallest buildings in the Waterloo Regional Municipality
List of tallest buildings in Windsor, Ontario

Notes

References

Ontario
Tallest